is a Japanese eroge visual novel game created by Ivory, which was originally released on March 14, 2006, for Windows. An English translation of Wanko to Kurasō was released on November 20, 2008.

Plot

It is set in Japan, in a world parallel to reality, with the exception being that there exist a variety of pets known as Anthropoid animals. These pets include cats, dogs and birds, though birds never make appearances in the game. They have human form (ears and tails seem to be the only outward changes in appearance), show some intelligence, and are even allowed to hold special jobs. However, they still retain much of their animal instincts, most notably the urge to mate during the Spring and Fall seasons.

The game has two routes, each focusing primarily on one or two characters: The Nadeshiko route, and the Risa route. Both routes, however, included development of other characters.
The Nadeshiko route revolves around the owner of a nearby pet-store, Nadeshiko, and her pet anthropoid dog, Kotarou. This route was translated before the Risa route, despite the lower popularity of Nadeshiko, possibly because of the greater amount of ero-scenes in her route. Yuuichi eventually ends up in a relationship with Nadeshiko, but is unable to ultimately commit.
The Risa route revolves more primarily around Risa, Mikan and Silvie, showing more character development, most notably with Risa.

Characters
Yuuichi  The protagonist of the story. He appears as friendly and helpful, but detaches himself from others, cynically denying the existence of true love. His cold personality is a result of his upbringing, which took place in a brothel. Over many years, he came to associate love with material gain and sexual gratification, and thus does not hold any stock in it. Yuuichi lives alone in an apartment, attends a nearby college and earns money by teaching a junior cram-school.
Mikan  An abandoned anthropoid dog. Yuuichi finds her unconscious in the rain one night while walking home, unable to let her just die, he takes her up to his apartment and treats her. Even though he told her she can only stay until the rain ends, she stays in fear and worry. She was the pet dog of a girl called Misa, who recently died. She is initially very shy and detached, due to her being unable to accept the death of her master, and thus Yuuichi assumes that she lacks the proper ability to speak. She is eventually taken in by Yuuichi and, after some time, opens up and proves herself to be exceptionally intelligent. Voiced by Ayaka Kimura
Risa  The younger sister to the late owner of Mikan. She was meant to take care of Mikan, but Mikan was unwilling to accept this arrangement. Risa eventually begins staying at Yuuichi's house for extended periods of time. She is, despite being a virgin, quite open with Yuuichi about her sexuality. In the Risa-route, she decides to attempt to become Yuuichi's first true love. In the end she married Yuuichi. Voiced by Saya Katsuki
Nadeshiko  The owner of a local pet store. Despite her incredibly young appearance, she is actually older than Yuuichi, which has confused many people about her, Yuuichi included. Initially helps Yuuichi with Mikan and Silvie, but in the Nadeshiko route, has a relationship with him. The relationship ends neutrally, however, with Nadeshiko and Yuuichi both realising that nothing will ultimately come out of it. Voiced by Haruka Fukai
Silviana  The pet dog of Risa. Initially the pet of a cruel breeder, she is rescued by Risa and Yuuichi. She is quiet and shy throughout the game, partially due to her relatively low intelligence. She is part of a rare and valuable breed of dog, and thus it was necessary for Yuuichi to spend a lot of money to free her. Voiced by Neko Kurosaki
Kotarou  The pet dog of Nadeshiko. Despite her average intelligence, she is a highly respected police dog, due to her excellent pedigree resulting in high capabilities. She was extremely violent and aggressive when younger, seriously injuring Nadeshiko. Now that she is more mature, she regrets behaving like she did, and has a very good relationship with Nadeshiko. Voiced by Yu
Kana  A student in Yuuichi's cram school. Is friendly to Yuuichi, helps him a lot, and often visits for food. She owns Kuu, an exceptionally intelligent anthropoid cat. Voiced by Miru
Kuu  The pet cat of Kana. Unusual for a cat, she is extremely intelligent. This intelligence results in her having conversations with Yuuichi about the psyche of anthropoid animals, due to her knowledge of them. She helps Yuuichi and Risa free Silvie by discovering that Silvie's previous owner was mistreating her. Voiced bu Yui Moegi
Seika  One of Kana's classmates who helps Yuuichi out on finding Mikan's owner. She has a crush on Yuuichi since she first met him, and later becomes one of his tutoring students just to spend time with him. She is a self-proclaimed expert on dogs and can be pretty hyper at times. She is the owner of Kaie, her anthropoid dog. Voiced by Kazene
Kaie  The pet dog of Seika. He is just as intelligent as Kuu, is kind and polite, and behaves to his owner as if he is her butler of sorts, addressing Seika as "milady". He was away to do advanced studies in the beginning of the game, but later returned. Voiced by Yuu Ayase

Reception
Wanko to Kurasou is fairly popular amongst the English-speaking community as an eroge visual novel. The art is generally accepted as being of high-quality, but the storyline is sometimes dismissed as being one-dimensional.

References

External links

Eroge
2006 video games
Video games about cats
Video games about dogs
Video games developed in Japan
Video games set in Japan
Visual novels
Windows games
Windows-only games